The Ed Palermo Big Band is a New York City-based ensemble that has been active since the late 70's, playing the compositions and arrangements of their leader, New Jersey born saxophonist Ed Palermo. The band is best known for Palermo's arrangements of the music of Frank Zappa, but they also perform and record compositions by Todd Rundgren, The Beatles, Miles Davis, Wayne Shorter, The Rolling Stones, Blodwyn Pig, King Crimson, Jethro Tull and many, many other composers from a wide range of genres.

Ed Palermo
Ed Palermo started playing the alto saxophone and the guitar in high school. By that time he knew he wanted to be a musician. Early influences that pushed him in that direction were the Beatles and the Mothers of Invention. Palermo also discovered a love for the music of Edgar Winter while in high school. This inspired him to emulate musicians such as Cannonball Adderley, Phil Woods, and Charlie Parker. In college he switched from alto saxophone to tenor saxophone due to influences from John Coltrane, Michael Brecker, and David Liebman. After graduating college, Palermo moved to New York in order to become a jazz tenor saxophonist. At this point, an album called "Impact" by Charles Tolliver inspired him to try his hand at arranging. Palermo looked to his friend Dave LaLama, already an arranger, for advice and he began to compose and arrange music. Soon he began playing with Tito Puente, and during this time, assembled a group which later expanded into the big band bearing his name.

Early years
In 1977, Ed Palermo assembled a nine-piece band to play his own compositions. The small group expanded into a big band and began a three-year residency at a New York club called Seventh Avenue South. During this time the band played primarily compositions by its leader along with his arrangements of other music. After three years, they were replaced by Gil Evans.

In 1982, they recorded their first LP and released it as Ed Palermo under a label called Vile Heifer. Later the LP became known as Papier Mache after the first song on the album. This LP featured guests such as Randy Brecker, David Sanborn, and Edgar Winter. The material on this album was mostly Palermo's original work, except for a few pieces that were co-written.

Due to the hassle involved in producing an album under one's own label, the Ed Palermo Big Band did not release another album until a record company showed interest. This happened in 1987. Ping Pong was released by Pro Jazz Records and featured much different material from the first album. This album featured less complicated music and more swing. From 1987 to 1993 the band alternated  performing at the clubs Visiones and the Bitter End.

Recent years
After Frank Zappa's death in 1993, Palermo decided to play a show of all Frank Zappa music. Before the show, Palermo posted a notice on an internet bulletin board. The turnout to the show was the largest that the Ed Palermo Big Band had had to date.

"Up until then, my own shows at The Bitter End were drawing next to nobody," said Palermo. "For some reason, the word got out about the Zappa show and the place was swamped. And it was incredibly exciting—people there were Zappa fanatics."

The idea was for only one tribute concert. But the band was contacted by Alan Pepper of The Bottom Line which led to a nine-year residency. For these shows they played primarily arrangements (done by Ed himself) of Frank Zappa songs, however, each show was different from the one before. The band often featured special guests at these shows such as Zappa alums Mike Keneally and Ike Willis.

They recorded their first Zappa album in 1977, The Ed Palermo Big Band Plays the Music of Frank Zappa, also known as Big Band Zappa, was released on Astor Place.

After nine years at The Bottom Line (1994–2003) they took a break from regular shows for a period of about a year. After that they began another series of regular shows at the Iridium Jazz Club in New York City. Since late 2018 the band acquired a monthly residency at Iridium playing a variety of musical genres and composers with a penchant for Frank Zappa.

In 2006. they released their second CD, Take Your Clothes Off When You Dance under the label of Cuneiform Records. In 2009 the group released their third CD, Eddy Loves Frank, also on Cuneiform. In February 2014, OH NO!! NOT JAZZ!! was released to rave reviews, including a four-star review in DownBeat Magazine. In 2015, the band released the album One Child Left Behind, featuring Napoleon Murphy Brock and Frank Zappa's sister Candy Zappa. In 2016, the band released the albums The Great Un-American Songbook, Volumes 1 & 2, also featuring Napoleon Murphy Brock, which also received a 4-star review from DownBeat Magazine.. Volume 3 will be released in 2020. Eddy Loves Frank, Oh No!! Not Jazz!!, One Child Left Behind, and The Great Un-American Songbook were all produced by the band's guitarist & vocalist, Bruce McDaniel. The next album was another well-reviewed release called The Adventures of Zodd Zundgren (Cuneiform 2017), a reinvention of the music Frank Zappa and Todd Rundgren. "The Adventures of Zodd Zundgren is big, irresistible fun." - Karl Ackermann, All About Jazz.  The band's latest is a jazz album titled A Lousy Day in Harlem (Sky Cat 2019). Palermo returns to his jazz roots with a combination of covers and original compositions. "Twenty-first century big-band music doesn’t get more exciting and impressive than this." - Jeff Tamarkin, JazzTimes

Palermo teaches music at Hoff/Barthelson in Scarsdale, New York. In 2018, Ed's band was "third best band on the rise" in Downbeat Poll's Rising Star category.

Members

Current

Additional Musicians/Performers

Former Musicians

Guests

Ed Alstrom
Jimmy Carl Black
Russ Bonagura
Tom Bowes
Napoleon Murphy Brock
Harvey Brooks
Felix Cabrera
Jim Clouse
Steve Cropper
Nicki Denner
Perry Gardner
Dave Glenn
Wycliffe Gordon
Thana Harris
Nina Hennessy
Mike James
Mike Keneally
John Korba
Ryan Krewer
Jimmy Leahey
Will Lee
Howard Levy
Gary Lucas
Deb Lyons
Mats & Morgan
Jenna McSwain
Mark Naftalin
George Naha
Gary Oleyar
Rob Paparozzi
Lloyd "Mr. Personality" Price
Elliott Randall
Carl Restivo
Todd Rundgren
Catherine Russell
David Sanborn
Rick Savage
John Sebastian
Mike Stern
Kasim Sulton
John Tabacco
Vaneese Thomas
Jimmy Vivino
Denny Walley
Ray White
Ike Willis
Edgar Winter
Candy Zappa

Discography
Papier Mache (Released as "Ed Palermo")

1982 Vile Heifer

Ping Pong

1987 Pro Jazz Records

The Ed Palermo Big Band Plays the Music of Frank Zappa (aka Big Band Zappa)

1997 Astor Place Records

Take Your Clothes Off When You Dance

2006 Cuneiform Records

Eddy Loves Frank

2009 Cuneiform Records

ELECTRIC BUTTER - ROB PAPAROZZI and THE ED PALERMO BIG BAND  "A Musical Tribute to Paul Butterfield and Michael Bloomfield"

2014 Jankland Recording

OH NO!! NOT JAZZ!!

2014 Cuneiform Records

DISC 1 ZAPPA

DISC 2 PALERMO

One Child Left Behind

2016 Cuneiform Records

The Great Un-American Songbook  Volumes I & II

2017 Cuneiform Records

Disc 1 - Vol. I

Disc 2 - Vol. II

The Adventures of Zodd Zundgren

2018 Cuneiform Records

A Lousy Day in Harlem

2019 Sky Cat Records

References

External links

Ed Palermo Big Band's official website
EPBB on ALLMUSIC
Cuneiform Records
www.united-mutations.com
EPBB on NPR

1977 establishments in New York City
American blues musical groups
American swing musical groups
American jazz ensembles from New York City
Big bands
Musical groups established in 1977
Swing revival ensembles